Eleni Prelorentzou (born 23 December 1968) is a Greek paracanoeist. Her highest achievement is reaching the semifinal in the paracanoe at the 2016 Summer Paralympics - Women's KL1. She has also competed in wheelchair fencing at the 2017 World Cup event in Pisa.

References

1968 births
Living people
Sportspeople from Athens
Greek female canoeists
Paracanoeists at the 2016 Summer Paralympics